Look at the Fool is the ninth and final studio album by American singer-songwriter Tim Buckley, released on September 13, 1974, by DiscReet Records.

Track listing
All tracks are written by Tim Buckley, except where noted.

Personnel
Tim Buckley – guitar, vocals
Venetta Fields, Clydie King, Sherlie Matthews – backing vocals
Joe Falsia – guitar, bass guitar, arranger, producer
Jim Fielder, Jim Hughart, Chuck Rainey – bass guitar
Jesse Ehrlich – cello
David Bluefield – clavinet on "Freeway Blues"
Mike Melvoin – organ, piano, Moog synthesizer
Mark Tiernan – electric piano
Terry Harrington – horn, saxophone
Richard Nash, William Peterson, John Rotella, Anthony Terran – horn
King Errisson – congas
Gary Coleman – percussion
Earl Palmer – drums
Technical
Stan Agol – recording and mixdown engineer
Wally Heider – mixing
Cal Schenkel – art direction
Napoleon – cover illustration

References

1974 albums
Tim Buckley albums
Albums recorded at Wally Heider Studios
Albums recorded at Record Plant (Los Angeles)